Yüksekören is a village in the District of Kozan, Adana Province, Turkey.

References

Villages in Kozan District